Coleophora frustrata is a moth of the family Coleophoridae. It is found in southern tablelands of New South Wales, Australia.

References

Moths of Australia
frustrata
Moths described in 1996